The Convention of Patriots for Justice and Peace (CPJP) is a rebel group in the Central African Republic (CAR), which was involved in fighting in the Central African Republic Bush War starting in 2004.
On June 12, 2011, the CPJP signed a ceasefire with the government of CAR.

Later, however, the CPJP joined the Séléka alliance which overthrew president François Bozizé in March 2013.

2012 peace agreement
On August 25, 2012 the CPJP, represented by Abdoulaye Hissène, signed a peace agreement with the government following up on the 2011 ceasefire.

Fundamental CPJP
A faction of the CPJP rejected the peace agreement and split off under the leadership of Hassan Al Habib. It goes by the name of "Fundamental CPJP". On September 15 the group attacked the towns of Sibut, Damara and Dekoa, which was the beginning of the 2012 Central African Republic rebellion.

Notes

References

Central African Republic Bush War
Factions of the Central African Republic Civil War
Rebel groups in the Central African Republic